John Haldane may refer to:

 John Haldane (MP) (1660–1721), MP for Scotland in the 1st Parliament of Great Britain
 John Scott Haldane (1860–1936), British physiologist
 John Haldane (priest) (1881–1938), Provost of Southwark
 John Burdon Sanderson Haldane (1892–1964), British biologist
 John Haldane (philosopher) (born 1954), British philosopher